Ezra "Jerry" Glantz (born January 28, 1945 in Los Angeles, California) is an American handball goalkeeper.

In 1976 he played as the goalkeeper of the USA Olympic team in Handball at the 1976 Montreal Summer Olympic games.
 
He was National goalkeeper for the Israeli National Handball team as well. He lived in Tel Aviv from 1954 till 1990. He won eight national championships as goalkeeper for several Israeli Handball teams and competed for years in the European Cup Handball Championshipson behalf of Israel.

Glantz was one of the original founders of Israeli Baseball and Fastpitch softball. As coach, many members of Israel's national baseball team players were groomed by Glantz. In July 2009 Jerry Glantz was inducted into the Israeli Hall of Fame.

References

1945 births
Living people
Sportspeople from Los Angeles
American male handball players
Olympic handball players of the United States
Handball players at the 1976 Summer Olympics
20th-century American people